Asen Kisimov (also known as Asen Angelov (Bulgarian: Асен Ангелов), 3 May 1936 – 13 July 2005) was a Bulgarian stage and film actor, singer and radio presenter.

He is best known for the famous songs which he sang for the soundtracks to the children's films The Hedgehogs' War (1979) and Vasko da Gama ot selo Rupcha (1986). Kisimov appeared in about 30 feature films between 1956 and 2000, most notably Be Happy, Ani! (1961), The Kindest Person I Know (1973), Something Out of Nothing (1979) and Monday Morning (1966, released 1988). He is also known for numerous stage performances as well as his radio program “An hour of the audience” which was broadcast by the Bulgarian National Radio for about 40 years. For his film, stage and audio works for the children, Kisimov was called Bate Asen.

Selected filmography

References

Sources

External links

1936 births
2005 deaths
Bulgarian male film actors
Bulgarian male stage actors
Bulgarian male television actors
Actors from Plovdiv
20th-century Bulgarian male actors
21st-century Bulgarian male actors
Musicians from Plovdiv